The reptilian snake eel (Brachysomophis henshawi), also known as Henshaw's snake eel, the Hawaiian crocodile eel or the crocodile snake eel, is an eel in the family Ophichthidae (worm/snake eels). It was described by David Starr Jordan and John Otterbein Snyder in 1904.

Biology

It is a marine, tropical eel which is known from the Indo-Pacific. During the night it often lets its head and neck protrude from its burrow, but during the day it only leaves its snout and some of its head exposed.

Etymology
The species epithet "henshawi" was given in honour of Henry W. Henshaw.

References

External links
 
 Henshaw's Snake Eel @ Fishes of Australia

reptilian snake eel
Fish of the Indian Ocean
Fish of the Pacific Ocean
Marine fish of Northern Australia
Taxa named by David Starr Jordan
Taxa named by John Otterbein Snyder
reptilian snake eel